Athmallik State was one of the princely states of India during the period of the British Raj. The state was a former jagir recognized as a state in 1874 and had its capital in Kaintaragarh near the town of Athmallik. Its last ruler Kishore Chandra Deo signed the accession to the Indian Union in 1948.

See also 
 Eastern States Agency

References

External links
Athmallik State – Pictures of the Palace

Princely states of Odisha
History of Odisha
Angul district
1785 establishments in India
1948 disestablishments in India